The Court at 1274–1282 North Raymond Avenue is a bungalow court located at 1274–1282 North Raymond Avenue in Pasadena, California. The court consists of five one-story bungalows arranged around a central courtyard. The houses are designed in a blend of the Colonial Revival and American Craftsman styles; the former can be seen in the entrance porticos on three of the buildings, while the latter is present in the homes' overhanging eaves and exposed rafter tails. Owner Karl Valentine designed and built the court in 1924–25.

The court was added to the National Register of Historic Places on November 15, 1994.

References

Bungalow courts
Bungalow architecture in California
Houses in Pasadena, California
Houses completed in 1925
Houses on the National Register of Historic Places in California
National Register of Historic Places in Pasadena, California
1925 establishments in California